Art's Way Manufacturing is an American producer of agricultural machinery, modular buildings and cutting tools under the brand names Art's Way, Art's Way Scientific and American Carbide Tool. The firm previously manufactured OEM feed blowers sold by Case New Holland.

History

Iowa farmer Arthur Luscombe (1922–2008) founded Art's Way Manufacturing in 1956 to produce and sell a power take-off powered grinder-mixer he had developed on his farm near Dolliver. By 1959, the business was manufacturing OEM grinder-mixers for Massey Ferguson, Owatonna / Gehl and International Harvester.

In 1974, Art's Way listed as a public company by initial public offering with Nasdaq code ARTW.

Following the 1994 sale of his Marc McConnell Tractor business to AGCO, Ward McConnell purchased Logan Falls based Logan Potato Equipment. In 1996, he merged the Logan enterprise with a then financially troubled Art's Way and joined the board of directors. In 2002, McConnell became Chairman, a role taken up by his son Marc in 2015.

Acquisitions and new businesses

Awards

 2015 - Award of Distinction from the Modular Building Institute for transgenic swine facility at Iowa State University's Zumwalt Station Farm in Ames, Iowa.
 2014 -  Award of Distinction from the Modular Building Institute for biomedical research building in California
 2008 - Fortune Small Business Magazine 57th best small cap company in America.
 2008 - Forbes magazine 54th best small company in America.

References

External links
 Art's Way (official website)

Agricultural machinery manufacturers of the United States